Dharan is a Bania clan (gotra) of India.

References

Ethnic groups in India
Bania communities
Gotras